Ningombam Bupenda Meitei (born 6 April 1987) is an Indian writer, essayist and poet in English and Meitei languages.

Early life
Ningombam Bupenda Meitei was born in Imphal, Manipur to the descendant of Maharaja Kullachandra of Manipur whose royal throne was recognised by the Viceroy of India, Lord Lansdowne. He went to Sainik School Imphal and St. Stephen's College, Delhi, University of Delhi.

Career
He taught philosophy at Hindu College, University of Delhi. He also taught physics and mathematics in Dehradun as a school teacher. He has composed many poems besides writing in philosophy and philosophy of physics. He is a member of International Network in Biolinguistics in which Prof. Noam Chomsky is also a member.

Works
 A countryside's innocent heart (2013), published by Lulu, is a collection of poems composed by the poet since his childhood. It took almost fifteen years to complete the book.
 Philosophical writings of a physics student (2013), published by Notion Press, is a collection of his philosophical articles. 
 How Rahul Gandhi kept democracy in Manipur safe from Modi.

The Nehruvian 
He founded The Nehruvian on the birth anniversary of Indira Gandhi, 19 November 2015, in Imphal, Manipur. The Nehruvian aims to spread the philosophy of Jawaharlal Nehru, the first Prime Minister of an independent India.

Political career 
He joined Indian National Congress as Chairperson, Social Media and Spokesperson of the party in Manipur Pradesh Congress Committee. Subsequently, Congress President Rahul Gandhi appointed  him as Regional Coordinator and asked him to look after the affairs of All India Fishermen Congress under All India Congress Committee in the eight states of North Eastern region of India. Presently, he is the party's spokesperson and media panelist in Manipur.

See also 
 International Network in Biolinguistics

References

References
 Google scholar
 Poem on Dr. Binayak Sen 
 in Smashwords poetry
 in Pothi poetry
 Hodson, Thomas Callan. The Meitheis. Harvard University, 1908.
 Meitei, Ningombam Bupenda. A countryside's innocent heart. ; Lulu publication, 2013.
 Meitei, Ningombam Bupenda. Selected philosophical writings of a physics student. ; Notion Press, 2013

1987 births
Living people
Indian male poets
People from Imphal
Meitei poets
Meitei people
Indian atheists
English-language writers from India
Meitei-language writers
St. Stephen's College, Delhi alumni
Poets from Manipur